The Cahiers québécois de démographie (English: Quebec Notebooks of Demography) is a peer-reviewed academic journal publishing original research in areas of demography, demographic analysis, and the demographics of Quebec and other populations.

The journal was established in 1971 and is published biannually by the Association des démographes du Québec (Quebec Association of Demographers), with support from the Demography Department at the Université de Montréal. Articles are published in French, with abstracts in French and English.

The journal is indexed in Revue des revues démographiques, Repère, Sociological Abstracts, and MEDLINE. Articles are freely available online through the Érudit publishing consortium.

Scope
The Cahiers québécois de démographie publishes articles on topics of mortality, fertility, migration, demographic theory, demographic measures, and related issues. Articles may focus on Quebec, Canada, or have an international perspective.

The journal occasionally publishes special volumes of interdisciplinary research on themes such as health, population ageing, urbanization, education, linguistic demography, historical demography, population policy, and the demographics of indigenous peoples, Francophone Africa, or other population groups.

History
The journal was originally entitled Bulletin de l'Association des démographes du Québec (Bulletin of the Quebec Association of Demographers). The name was changed to its current title in 1976.

References

External links
 
 Association des démographes du Québec 

Demography journals
Open access journals
Publications established in 1971
Demographics of Canada
Biannual journals
Université de Montréal
French-language journals
1971 establishments in Quebec